Flatness in systems theory is a system property that extends the notion of controllability from linear systems to nonlinear dynamical systems. A system that has the flatness property is called a flat system. Flat systems have a (fictitious) flat output, which can be used to explicitly express all states and inputs in terms of the flat output and a finite number of its derivatives.

Definition 
A nonlinear system

is flat, if there exists an output

that satisfies the following conditions:

 The signals  are representable as functions of the states  and inputs  and a finite number of derivatives with respect to time : .
 The states  and inputs  are representable as functions of the outputs  and of its derivatives with respect to time .

If these conditions are satisfied at least locally, then the (possibly fictitious) output is called flat output, and the system is flat.

Relation to controllability of linear systems 

A linear system 

For linear systems both properties are equivalent, hence exchangeable.

Significance 
The flatness property is useful for both the analysis of and controller synthesis for nonlinear dynamical systems. It is particularly advantageous for solving trajectory planning problems and asymptotical setpoint following control.

Literature 
 M. Fliess, J. L. Lévine, P. Martin and P. Rouchon: Flatness and defect of non-linear systems: introductory theory and examples. International Journal of Control 61(6), pp. 1327-1361, 1995 
 A. Isidori, C.H. Moog et A. De Luca. A Sufficient Condition for Full Linearization via Dynamic State Feedback. 25th CDC IEEE, Athens, Greece, pp. 203 - 208, 1986

See also 
 Control theory
 Control engineering
 Controller (control theory)
 Flat pseudospectral method

Control theory